Jung Dong-hyun (born 1 June 1988) is an alpine skier from South Korea.  He competed for South Korea at the 2010 Winter Olympics where he failed to finish the first run of the slalom. He has qualified seven times to a World Cup second run in slalom, best result being 14th in Zagreb in 2017.

References

External links
 
 

1988 births
Living people
South Korean male alpine skiers
Olympic alpine skiers of South Korea
Alpine skiers at the 2010 Winter Olympics
Alpine skiers at the 2014 Winter Olympics
Alpine skiers at the 2018 Winter Olympics
Alpine skiers at the 2022 Winter Olympics
Asian Games medalists in alpine skiing
Alpine skiers at the 2011 Asian Winter Games
Alpine skiers at the 2017 Asian Winter Games
Asian Games gold medalists for South Korea
Asian Games bronze medalists for South Korea
Medalists at the 2011 Asian Winter Games
Medalists at the 2017 Asian Winter Games
21st-century South Korean people